Guist Creek Lake is a  reservoir about five miles (8 km) east of Shelbyville, Kentucky. It was created in 1961 by impounding Guist Creek. Guist Creek Lake is in the Salt River drainage basin.

Record fish
Two Kentucky state record fish were taken from Guist Creek Lake:

Bullhead catfish, 5 lb 3oz, caught by Harry Case on October 18, 1992
White catfish, 1 lb 9oz, caught by Charles Crain on May 3, 2004

Creel limits
Channel catfish - must be over 12 inches (.3 m)
All other species follow ky state regulations

See also
Geography of Louisville, Kentucky

References

External links
2006 Kentucky fishing forecast

Infrastructure completed in 1961
Reservoirs in Kentucky
Protected areas of Shelby County, Kentucky
Bodies of water of Shelby County, Kentucky
Salt River (Kentucky)